Lina Guérin (born 16 April 1991) is a French rugby union player. She was a member of the France women's national rugby sevens team to the 2016 Summer Olympics. She has played in 22 matches in the Women's Sevens Series so far, made 12 tries and scored 60 points.

References

External links 
 
 
 
 

1991 births
Living people
Female rugby sevens players
Rugby sevens players at the 2016 Summer Olympics
French female rugby union players
Olympic rugby sevens players of France
France international rugby sevens players
Rugby sevens players at the 2020 Summer Olympics
Medalists at the 2020 Summer Olympics
Olympic silver medalists for France
Olympic medalists in rugby sevens
France international women's rugby sevens players